Ripp may refer to:

As a surname
 Andrew Ripp, American singer-songwriter
 Artie Ripp, American music industry executive
 Hans-Jürgen Ripp, American politician
 Keith Ripp, German association football player

Other
 Friend Ripp, a 1923 German silent film 
 Ribosomally synthesized and post-translationally modified peptides (RiPP), a class of peptides

See also
 Ripps (disambiguation)